Elmwood Cemetery is located at 2905 Thatcher Avenue, in River Grove, Illinois. It features a cenotaph of comedian John Belushi, although his remains are buried elsewhere. However, his mother, Agnes Belushi, is buried in the same location.

Notable burials
 Johann Otto Hoch – (1862–1906)
 John Siomos – (1947–2004)
 Ron Sobie – (1934–2009)
 Jazep Varonka – (1891–1952)

References

External links
 Official website

Cemeteries in Cook County, Illinois